Swamp City Roller Derby (formerly Swamp City Roller Rats) is a women's flat track roller derby league, based in Palmerston North, New Zealand.

History

The league was founded in March 2010, by Trudy Hannon (Joanie Trash) and Kyla Sinclair (Dutch Courage).  By May of the same year the league was already attracting over 30 people to practices and by January 2011 the league boasted 50 members.

The league began training in cramped conditions at Bell Hall until a new rink was opened at the Palmerston North Leisureplex in January 2011.

In July 2011 the Swamp Rats played their first competitive bout against Mountain City Rollers and Mount Militia Derby Crew in New Plymouth.

In August of the same year they hosted their first home bout - a round robin triple-header against Taranaki Roller Corp's Rumble Bees and the Richter City Roller Derby Convicts (Richter's B team) from Wellington.  Swamp City won both their bouts, with the Rumble Bees taking out their bout against the Convicts.

The league's A team was originally called The Plague.  The team was later renamed the All Stars.  The league has also had a B team at times.  The first B team was called the Poison Ivies.  After a year-long hiatus in 2014 a new B team was launched in 2015 called the Badda Bings.  In 2016 the league renamed their Facebook page and website from Swamp City Roller Rats to Swamp City Roller Derby.

Notable achievements

In 2011, Swamp City skater Just Ass 4 All (Justine Saunders) was selected for the Roller Derby Team New Zealand training squad, but was not included in the final travel team.

August 2012 saw the Swamp City Roller Rats host the country's first national tournament, dubbed Derby Royale, with 13 teams from all over New Zealand participating.  Notably missing was the country's oldest league, Pirate City Rollers.  Swamp City's team The Plague were runners up in the competition, losing to Auckland Roller Derby League in the final.  

The league hosted a second Derby Royale tournament in October 2013.  The event was expanded from 13 to 16 teams, with competition now stretching over two full days.  The Swamp City team made the semi-finals, falling to eventual champions Pirate City Rollers. 

In June 2015 the Swamp City All Stars played in their first international tournament, the Royal Rumble Derby Tournament in Gold Coast, Australia, hosted by Paradise City Roller Derby, finishing with a one-win, one-loss record.  At the end of that year they were ranked 4th on Geex Quad's New Zealand Roller Derby Rankings table.  The Badda Bings were ranked 18th.

In 2016 members of the league were instrumental in the organization of the New Zealand Derby Top 10 Champs competition.  Swamp City's All Stars finished 3rd in their pool, qualifying for the Plate finals and finishing 7th overall.  They also finished 7th on the rankings table.  The Badda Bings were ranked 22nd.

References

External links 
 Swamp City website
 Swamp City on Facebook

Roller derby leagues established in 2010
Roller derby leagues in New Zealand
Sport in Palmerston North
2010 establishments in New Zealand